Steel is a metal alloy that is composed principally of iron and carbon.

Steel may also refer to:

Specific iron alloys
 Low alloy steel, steel alloyed with other elements
 Carbon steel, also called plain carbon steel, a combination of iron and carbon
 Damascus steel, a variety of steel used between 900 and 1600 for making swords
 Stainless steel, a variety of steel containing at least 10.5% chromium

Steel grades
 Steel grades, to classify steels by their composition and physical properties
 AISI steel grades, American Iron and Steel Institute (AISI) standard steel grades

Other metal objects
 Firesteel for generating of sparks by impacts with flints 
 Honing steel, a rod used for realigning the microscopic edge of blades
 Steel guitar, a special type of guitar and a special way of playing it
 Steel, a device held against the strings when playing a steel guitar
 Sword, sometimes termed "steel" in certain cultures
 Steel belt, used in many industries such as food, chemical, wood processing and transportation.

Steel related
Steel abrasive, loose particles used for blast cleaning or to improve the properties of metal surfaces

People
Steel (surname)
Two American professional wrestlers who used the stage name Steel:
Sean Morley (born 1971)
Kevin Nash (born 1959)

Art and entertainment
 Steel (comics), a name used by several fictional characters in DC Comics
 Steel (video game), a 1989 science fiction shoot 'em up
 Steel Brightblade, a fictional character in the Dragonlance novels
 Steel, a fictional type of Pokémon in the gameplay of Pokémon

Film and television
 Steel (1933 film), an Italian drama film directed by Walter Ruttmann
 Steel (1979 film), a drama film directed by Steve Carver
 Steel (1997 film), an American film based on the DC Comics character
 Steel (2012 film), an Italian drama film directed by Stefano Mordini
 Steel (TV channel), an Italian TV channel
 "Steel" (The Twilight Zone), a 1963 television episode

Music
 Steel (band), a power metal project by Dan Swanö and Opeth members
 Steel (Battle Beast album), 2012
 Steel (soundtrack), from the 1997 film

Other
 Steel (pusher), a Finnish pusher vessel
 Steel (web browser), a defunct web browser for Android
 Steel blue, a dark blue-gray color
 Steel Pier, an amusement boardwalk pier in Atlantic City, New Jersey
 Southern Steel, a New Zealand netball team

See also
 Steele (disambiguation)
 Steal (disambiguation)
 Dr. Steel (disambiguation)
 Steel Town (disambiguation)
 De Stijl
 Sapphire & Steel, British television series 
 British Steel (album), album by Judas Priest